Anna Gyarmati (born 1993) is a Hungarian snowboarder. She competed at the FIS Freestyle Ski and Snowboarding World Championships 2015, where she qualified for the slopestyle final, and placed sixth in the final.

References

External links

Hungarian female snowboarders
1993 births
Living people
Place of birth missing (living people)
Sportspeople from Eger